D. J. Jones may refer to:
D. J. Jones (offensive lineman) (born 1988), American football player
D. J. Jones (defensive lineman) (born 1995), American football player